Ratkovo is a rural locality (a village) in Filippovskoye Rural Settlement, Kirzhachsky District, Vladimir Oblast, Russia. The population was 139 as of 2010. There are 21 streets.

Geography 
Ratkovo is located 36 km southwest of Kirzhach (the district's administrative centre) by road. Zarechye is the nearest rural locality.

References 

Rural localities in Kirzhachsky District